Cabella Ligure is a comune (municipality) in the Province of Alessandria in the Italian region Piedmont, located about  southeast of Turin and about  southeast of Alessandria. 
  
Cabella Ligure borders the following municipalities: Albera Ligure, Carrega Ligure, Fabbrica Curone, Mongiardino Ligure, Ottone, Rocchetta Ligure, and Zerba.

Transport 
Located deep in the Valley of Borbera, the town can be readily accessed by either private transport or by public bus, the latter operated by Autolinee Val Borbera. Their services operate to the nearest rail link at Arquata Scrivia and to the large mall complex at Serravalle. 

The road SP140 is the main road that connects Cabella to the nearby municipalities and to Arquata. It is a popular route by cyclers who look to cross the Apennine section of Piedmonte/Liguria.

Economy 
Cabella is a seasonal location for tourism. Across June-September, the inhabitants of the town may well increase three to fourfold. These tourists come from around the world to pay visit to Shri Mataji's Castle, and to visit other locations administered by the Shri Mataji Foundation. The agriculture sector in the vicinity of Cabella has dwindled over the past decades.

References

External links
 Cabella Ligure photos

Cities and towns in Piedmont